The 12th edition of the Tanzania Music Awards took place at the Diamond Jubilee Hall in Dar es Salaam, on Saturday March 26, 2011. Bongo Flava artist 20 Percent was the big winner of the night with five trophies out of seven nominations. The artist himself was not present and he was represented by his producer Man Water. Winner Lady Jaydee was also absent during the Award ceremony and a fan collected the two awards on her behalf. The artist later stated she had not received an invitation for the event. Singer Diamond Platnumz, who won three awards in the 2010 Tanzania Music Awards was nominated in four categories, although he was among those who left empty-handed.

Nominees and winners
Winners are in bold text.

Best Male Artist
20 Percent
Ali Kiba
AY
Barnaba Classic
Belle 9
Diamond Planumz

Best Female Artist
Lady Jaydee
Khadija Kopa
Linah
Mwasiti
Shaa

Best Male Singer
20 Percent
Ali Kiba
Banana Zorro
Barnaba Classic
Belle 9
Diamond Platnumz

Best Female Singer
Linah
Khadija Kopa
Lady Jaydee
Mwasiti
Shaa

Best Song Writer
20 Percent
Barnaba
Lady Jaydee
Mrisho Mpoto
Mzee Yusuph

Best Upcoming Artist
Linah
Bob Junior
Sajna
Sam wa Ukweli
Top C

Best Hip Hop Artist
Joh Makini
Chidi Benz
Fid Q
Godzilla
Ngwear

Best Rapper (from a Band)
Khalid Chokoraa
Ferguson
Kitokololo
Msafiri Diouf
Toto ze Bingwa

Best Song
20 Percent - 'Tamaa Mbaya'
20 Percent - 'Ya Nini Malumbano'
Chege & Temba feat Wahu - 'Mkono Mmoja'
Gelly wa Ryme feat AT & Ray C - 'Mama Ntilie'
Sam wa Ukweli - 'Sina Raha'
Tip Top Connection - 'Bado Tunapanda'

Best Video
CPWAA ft Ms. Triniti, Mangwair & Dully Sykes - 'Action'
20 Percent - 'Ya nini Malumbano'
20 Percent - 'Tamaa Mbaya'
Bob Junior - 'Oyoyo'
Diamond Platnumz - 'Mbagala'
Gelly wa Ryme feat AT & Ray C - 'Mama Ntilie'

Best Afro Pop Song
20 Percent - 'Ya Nini Malumbano'
20 Percent - 'Tamaa Mbaya'
Bob Junior - 'Oyoyo'
Diamond - 'Mbagala'
Gelly wa Rymes Ft AT & Ray C - 'Mama ntilie'

Best R&B Song
Ben Pol - 'Nikikupata'
Belle 9 - 'We ni Wangu'
Hussein Machozi ft Maunda Zorro - 'Hello'
Linah - 'Atatamani'
Z-Anton - 'Kisiwa cha Malavidavi'

Best Zouk/Rumba Song
Barnaba - 'Nabembelezwa'
Amini - 'Bado Robo Saa'
Linah - 'Bora Nikimbie'
Sam wa Ukweli - 'Sina Raha'
Top C - 'Ulofa'

Best Hip Hop Song
JCB ft Fid Q & Chidi Benz - 'Ukisikia Paah'
AY & Mwana FA - 'Usije Mjini'
Fid Q - 'Propaganda'
Joh Makini - 'Karibu Tena'
Nick wa Pili ft Joh Makini- 'Higher'

Best Collaboration Song
JCB ft Fid Q & Chidi Benz & Jay Moe- 'Ukisikia Paah'
Chege & Temba ft Wahu - 'Mkono Mmoja'
FA & AY ft Hardmad - 'Dakika Moja'
Gelly wa Ryme feat AT & Ray C - 'Mama Ntilie'
Offside trick ft Bi Kidude - 'Ahmada'

Best Swahili Song (from a Band)
Mapacha Watatu ft Mzee Yusuph - 'Shika Ushikapo'
Akudo - ''
Extra Bongo - 'Laptop'
Twanga Pepeta - ''
Twanga Pepeta - ''

Best Ragga/Dancehall Song
CPWAA ft Ms. Triniti, Mangwair & Dully Sykes - 'Action'
 Benjamin wa mambo Jambo      - 'My Friend'
 Benjamin wa mambo Jambo ft AT - 'Nimefulia'
Big Jah Man ft Richard - 'Far Away'
Jet Man - 'Kiuno Weka Busy'

Best Reggae Song
Hardmad ft Enika & BNV- 'Ujio Mpya'
Bob Lau Mwalugaja - 'Reggae Swadakta'
Hardmad - 'What u Feel inside'
Jhiko Man - 'Sayuni'
Ras Rwanda Magere - 'Sauti ya rasta'
Warriors from the East - 'Misinga ya Rasta'

Best Taarab Song
Jahazi - 'My Valentine'
Isha Ramadhani - 'Acheni Kuniandama'
Isha Ramadhani - 'Mama Nipe Radhi'
Jahazi - 'Langu Rohoni'
Khadija Kopa - 'Top in Town'

Best East African Song
 /  Kidum & Lady Jaydee - 'Nitafanya'
 Alpha ft AY - 'Songa Mbele'
 Bebe Cool - 'Kasepiki'
 Goodlyfe Crew - 'Vuvuzela'
 P-Unit - 'Kare'

Best Traditional Song
Mpoki ft Cassim - 'Shangazi'
Mataluma - 'Kariakoo'
Mrisho Mpoto - 'Adela'
Offsidetrick ft Bi Kidude - 'Ahmada'
Ommy G - 'Wa Mbele Mbele'

Best Producer
Lamar
Bob Junior
Man Walter
Marco Chali
Pancho Latino

Hall of Fame trophy
to an individual: Said Mabera
to an institution: Tanzania Broadcasting Radio (TBC): Institutional Award for their preservation of Tanzania's musical heritage

See also
Tanzania Music Awards
Music of Tanzania

References

External links
Tanzania Music Awards Official website

2011 music awards
2011 in Tanzania